The  is an iris flower garden approximately 1,25 km (2 miles) northeast of Shisō in Hyōgo Prefecture, in the Kansai region of Japan.

References

External links

Shisō, Hyōgo
Gardens in Hyōgo Prefecture
Botanical gardens in Japan
1979 establishments in Japan